Stephen "Steve" Hine (born 20 April 1969 from Coventry) is an English professional darts player who plays in World Darts Federation events. He works as a baker and consequently he is nicknamed The Muffin Man. He is well known for bringing muffins and throwing them to the crowd during his walk-on.

Darts career

PDC
He reached the quarter-finals of the 2007 UK Open, claiming victories over Alan Tabern, Adrian Gray and Colin Monk before losing 6–11 to Colin Lloyd.

Hine has played in the PDC World Darts Championship four times. He lost in the first round in 2006 and 2008, but made the second round on his third attempt in 2010 after defeating 32nd seed Roland Scholten. This set up a second round meeting with Phil Taylor, who soundly defeated Hine in straight sets.

At the 2011 World Championship, Hine played against Raymond van Barneveld in the first round. He took the first set before eventually losing 1–3.

Hine Quit the PDC in 2020 due to not regaining a Tour Card.

WDF
As of January 2020, Hine rejoined the World Darts Federation some decent performances in the Tournaments which saw him get to the Scottish Open final but losing 6–2 to Jim Williams. He qualified for the 2022 WDF World Darts Championship which takes place in April, Hine will be unseeded in this event.

World Championship results

PDC
 2006: First round (lost to Chris Mason 1–3)
 2008: First round (lost to Mark Dudbridge 1–3)
 2010: Second round (lost to Phil Taylor 0–4)
 2011: First round (lost to Raymond van Barneveld 1–3)

WDF
 2022: Third round (lost to Thibault Tricole 1-3)

Outside darts
Hine supports Coventry City F.C. and the Coventry Bees speedway team.

References

External links
 Official Website

1969 births
English darts players
Living people
Sportspeople from Coventry
Professional Darts Corporation former tour card holders
PDC ranking title winners